In Euclidean geometry, the trillium theorem – (from , literally 'lemma about trident', literally 'theorem of trillium' or 'theorem of trefoil') is a statement about properties of inscribed and circumscribed circles and their relations.

Theorem 

Let  be an arbitrary triangle.
Equivalently:
In particular, this implies that the center of this circle lies on the circumcircle.
This is often referred to as the “Incenter-Excenter Lemma”.

Proof 

By the inscribed angle theorem,

 

Since  is an angle bisector,

 

We also get

Application to triangle reconstruction
This theorem can be used to reconstruct a triangle starting from the locations only of one vertex, the incenter, and the circumcenter of the triangle.
For, let  be the given vertex,  be the incenter, and  be the circumcenter. This information allows the successive construction of:
the circumcircle of the given triangle, as the circle with center  and radius ,
point  as the intersection of the circumcircle with line ,
the circle of the theorem, with center  and radius , and
It may also produce a triangle for which the given point  is an excenter rather than the incenter.

Other triangle reconstruction problems, such as the reconstruction of a triangle from a vertex, incenter, and center of its nine-point circle, can be solved by reducing the problem to the case of a vertex, incenter, and circumcenter.

Generalization
Let  and  be any two of the four points given by the incenter and the three excenters of a triangle .

See also 
 Angle bisector theorem

References

External links

Theorems about triangles and circles